The Central America-4 Free Mobility Agreement (CA-4) is a treaty signed in June 2006 between the Central American nations of El Salvador, Guatemala, Honduras, and Nicaragua, establishing the free movement across borders between the four signatory states of their citizens without any restrictions or checks.  Foreign nationals who enter one of the signatory countries can also travel to other signatory states by land (but not by air) without having to obtain additional permits or to undergo checks at border checkpoints.  Similar to the Schengen Agreement in Europe, the CA-4 Agreement establishes a harmonized visa regime for nationals travelling to the area.

See also 
 Central America-4 passport
 Visa policy of El Salvador
 Visa policy of Guatemala
 Visa policy of Honduras
 Visa policy of Nicaragua

References 

 
2006 in El Salvador
2006 in Guatemala
2006 in Honduras
2006 in Nicaragua
Boundary treaties
El Salvador–Guatemala border
El Salvador–Honduras border
Guatemala–Honduras border
Honduras–Nicaragua border
Honduras–Nicaragua relations
Treaties concluded in 2006
Treaties of El Salvador
Treaties of Guatemala
Treaties of Honduras
Treaties of Nicaragua
International organizations based in the Americas